The Danish Ministry of Higher Education and Science is the Danish ministry in charge of research and education above high school/upper secondary school.

The ministry has also been known as the "Ministry of Science, Innovation and Higher Education", the "Ministry of Science, Technology and Innovation of Denmark", the "Science Ministry", the "Research Ministry", and the "Ministry of Research and Technology".

Its primary purpose is to promote and coordinate the interaction between the industry and trade, centres of research and education and strengthen industry and research policies.

List of ministers

External links
 Ministry of Higher Education and Science

Science
Science and technology in Denmark
Denmark
Ministries established in 2001
2001 establishments in Denmark